Yuliya Kancheva (July 7, 1956 – June 11, 2019) was a Bulgarian actress, television producer and film director.

Biography 

Kancheva was born July 1st, 1956 in Sofia, Bulgaria. She graduated from the Krastyo Sarafov National Academy for Theatre and Film Arts in Sofia in 1980 with a specialty in film directing, studying under professor Yanko Yankov.

Kancheva was an author and director of 17 documentary movies, two TV series, one feature-length short story, a TV feature film, and several TV shows made for the Bulgarian National Television (BNT).

Kancheva was a member of the International Documentary Association (IDA), as well as the National Union of Bulgarian Film Makers, and the National Bulgarian Union of Journalists.

The New Bulgarian University named her "Teacher of the Year" in 2008.

Awards received 

In 1989, Yuliya Kancheva received the "Silver Dragon" award from the Film Festival in Krakow, Poland, for the movie "Zhivotat e pred nas", (1988).

Filmography

As a director or a producer 

 Bez Semeina Prilika (2004)
 Made in Bulgaria (1992)
 Viensko Kolelo (1991)
 Zhivotat e pred nas (1988)

As an actress 
 Yudino Zhelyazo (1989)
 Adios, Muchachos (1978)

References 

1956 births
2019 deaths
Bulgarian film actresses
Bulgarian television producers
Bulgarian film directors
National Academy for Theatre and Film Arts alumni
Academic staff of New Bulgarian University
Actresses from Sofia
20th-century Bulgarian actresses
Women television producers
Bulgarian women film directors